The Speedway Grand Prix of Latvia is a speedway event that is a part of the Speedway Grand Prix Series.

History
From 2006 until 2017 the Grand Prix was held at the Latvijas Spīdveja Centrs. In 2023, the event returned to Latvia but at the new venue known as Riga Speedway Stadium.

Winners

Most win
 Greg Hancock  3 times

References

See also
 Latvia national speedway team

 
Grand Prix
Latvia